Cyperus expansus is a species of sedge that is native to parts of Réunion.

See also 
 List of Cyperus species

References 

expansus
Plants described in 1806
Flora of Réunion
Taxa named by Jean Louis Marie Poiret